Alfonso Andria (born 27 May 1952 in Salerno) is an Italian politician and Member of the European Parliament for Southern with the Margherita Party, part of the Alliance of Liberals and Democrats for Europe and sits on the European Parliament's Committee on Regional Development.

He is a substitute for the Committee on the Environment, Public Health and Food Safety, a member of the Delegation for relations with the United States and a substitute for the Delegation for relations with Switzerland, Iceland and Norway and to the European Economic Area (EEA) Joint Parliamentary Committee.

Education
 1978: Graduate in law

Career
 1973-1995: Director of the provincial tourism authority of Salerno
 Member of the 'Margherita' party executive
 1985-1993: Member of Salerno Municipal Council
 1995-2004: Chairman of Salerno Provincial Council
 1995-1999: Member of the Bureau of the UPI - Union of the Provincial Councils of Italy
 Former regional Vice-Chairman of the AICCRE
 2001-2004: Chairman of the Federal Council of the League of Local Authorities
 2002-2004: Member of the Committee of the Regions of the European Union
 until 2001: Chairman of the Board of Directors of the company managing the European Employment Pact for Agro Nocerino-Sarnese
 responsible for the contract for the Salerno 'Crater'
 former member of the CNEL consultative committee for the Mezzogiorno (Coordinator)
 General Secretary (1983–1988), adviser to the Chairman (1988–2001) and Chairman (since 2002) of the European University Centre for the Cultural Heritage of Ravello
 Chairman of the Board of Directors of the Consortium PRUSST 'Ospitalità da favola' and the Atheneum Consortium (Training in film, television and multi-media work)

Decorations
 Commander of the Order of St Gregory the Great
 Knight of the Sacred Military Constantinian Order of Saint George

See also
 2004 European Parliament election in Italy

External links
 
 

1952 births
Living people
People from Salerno
Democratic Party (Italy) politicians
MEPs for Italy 2004–2009
21st-century Italian politicians
Democracy is Freedom – The Daisy MEPs
Presidents of the Province of Salerno